Michael Roland Ratledge (born 6 May 1943) is a British musician. A part of the Canterbury scene, he was a founding member of Soft Machine. He was the last founding member to leave the group, doing so in 1976.

Biography and career
Ratledge was born in Maidstone, Kent, the son of a Canterbury secondary modern school headmaster. As a child, he was educated in classical music, the only kind of music played in his parents' home. He learned to play the piano, and with his friend Brian Hopper, whom he had met at Simon Langton Grammar School for Boys in Canterbury, played classical piano and clarinet pieces.

Ratledge also met Brian's younger brother Hugh, and Robert Wyatt. In 1961, he met Daevid Allen, who interested them in playing jazz. Through Cecil Taylor's piano pieces Ratledge became familiar with the music of Thelonious Monk, Miles Davis and John Coltrane. In 1963, he played in the Daevid Allen Trio. Unlike his friends, Ratledge wanted to further his education, and studied at University College, Oxford, where he earned a degree in psychology and philosophy.

At the same time, he attended music lessons, and was educated by avant-garde musicians Mal Dean and Rab Spall. After his graduation, Ratledge intended to go to a university in the United States, but his application for a scholarship was filed too late.

In 1966, his friends were forming a new band and asked Ratledge to join. Soft Machine included Robert Wyatt, Daevid Allen, and Kevin Ayers. There were many personnel changes, and by 1973, Ratledge was the only remaining founding member.

In November 1973, Ratledge participated in a live performance of Mike Oldfield's Tubular Bells for the BBC. In 1976, Ratledge decided to leave Soft Machine to build a solo career, leaving the band under Karl Jenkins' management. Ratledge built himself a studio and composed a score for the film Riddles of the Sphinx.

As Soft Machine's longest-lasting member, he was a part of the band's changes in musical direction from psychedelic music to jazz-rock. In the 1980s, Ratledge was active as a composer and musical producer for commercials and the theatre. In 1995, Adiemus (Ratledge, Karl Jenkins and Miriam Stockley) released Songs of Sanctuary, which Ratledge co-produced with Karl Jenkins and for which he programmed the electronic percussion.

Personal life
Ratledge married Marsha Hunt on 15 April 1967.

Discography

References

1943 births
Living people
Musicians from Kent
People from Maidstone
English keyboardists
Soft Machine members
Canterbury scene
Progressive rock keyboardists